The Autostadt (German for Automobile City) is a visitor attraction adjacent to the Volkswagen factory in Wolfsburg, Germany, with a prime focus on automobiles. The complex was designed by Henn GmbH.

It features a museum, feature pavilions for the principal automobile brands in the Volkswagen Group, a customer centre where customers can pick up new cars, and take a tour through the enormous factory, a guide to the evolution of roads, and cinema in a large sphere.

History
The idea for Autostadt was started in 1994 when the concept of documenting the stages of production of Volkswagen vehicles and how the company's operations were showcased at Expo 2000 in Hanover, Germany.  In 1998, Autostadt, which is German for "Automobile City", broke ground on the former site of a fuel company bordering Volkswagen's Wolfsburg production plant.  Like the adjacent car plant, the site of Autostadt is on the north bank of the Mittelland Canal. The resulting complex is the work of more than 400 architects, created as a new urban center, close to downtown Wolfsburg.

By that time it was reported that Volkswagen had invested approximately 850 Million Marks (€435 Million) in the project. Autostadt is located next to Volkswagen's main factory which is also an attraction. Every Volkswagen model is available giving the opportunity for the public to choose what they want. Volkswagen then manufactures the car specified according to the purchaser's requirements.

Visitors and attractions

Autostadt attracts around 2 million visitors a year.  It is very popular because of the ultra modern architecture it features in each building. Extensive use is made of water and vegetation between the pavilions and mounds of earth covered in grass are located in the grounds.  Modern design is not just incorporated into the pavilions but also into the furniture such as benches and chairs.

It has a small track for the off-road Volkswagen Touareg underneath the bridge which leads from the main town to the Autostadt which is located above the main canal cutting through the city, the Mittelland Canal.  Visitors must be able to show driving licences before being able to drive the vehicles.  First, the guide drives the car around the track showing the features of the vehicle and giving information of the vehicle's capabilities.  After driving around the track, the visitor can then drive around the track under the surveillance of the guide who sits in the passenger seat.  Any other passengers sit in the back.  Features of the track include a 21 degree angled hill, another hill which is angled on the side, a water tank, a sand pit which is located under a road bridge, a log road and a numerous small mounds which allow one wheel to be raised off the ground.

There is a mini track for children where they can drive small electric cars in the form of Volkswagen Beetles.

Autostadt has a large variety of multimedia activities and devices which include car design software.  There is a room exhibiting the advantages and disadvantages different fuels have on the performance of cars.  There are two cinemas which show small films in German.  One of these cinemas is located in its own purpose built buildings and is in a large sphere.

Major attractions are some famous cars, such as the first petrol vehicle produced, and the Beetle.

There are two 60 meter/200 ft tall glass silos (AutoTürme) used as storage for new Volkswagens. The two towers are connected to the Volkswagen factory by a 700-metre tunnel.  When cars arrive at the towers they are carried up at a speed of 1.5 metres per second.  The render for the Autostadt shows 6 towers.  When purchasing a car from Volkswagen (the main brand only, not the sub-brands) in select European countries, it is optional if the customer wants it delivered to the dealership where it was bought or if the customer wants to travel to Autostadt to pick it up.  If the latter is chosen, the Autostadt supplies the customer with free entrance, meal tickets and a variety of events building up to the point where the customer can follow on screen as the automatic elevator picks up the selected car in one of the silos.  The car is then transported out to the customer without having driven a single meter, and the odometer is thus on "0".

There is also a room with interactive devices which provide information on the design of cars using Audi as an example.  Computer software allows visitors to design their own cars using features from Audi cars.

Pavilions at Autostadt
There are seven pavilions dedicated to car manufacturers at Autostadt.

Volkswagen production and development

There are two pavilions for Volkswagen which show production and the development of cars.

The Volkswagen development pavilion is the largest in ground area of all pavilions at Autostadt.  The pavilion is circular in shape and has two floors which display all models in the Volkswagen range plus a shop of Volkswagen articles of clothing, die cast models and vehicle accessories which is located on the top floor.

The production pavilion is the smallest and one of the last of the pavilions to be constructed.  It was not included on the original render of Autostadt.

Porsche

The Porsche pavilion is circular-shaped, the interior design is simple yet elegant. The visitors enter on a descending curved corridor entering the only hall of the pavilion. There are three models on display, a Boxster, a 911 and  a Panamera. Behind them there are small models of the previous cars in the history of the marque with the oldest displayed with the smallest and the generation just before the current one the biggest in scale. Next to the cars on display, there is a black couch fitted with iPads running an app which shows the history of Porsche with pictures and videos on the former generations.

Premium Clubhouse (formerly Bentley)
The pavilion is built into a small hill. It has a marble roof and the entrance is cut into the side of the grass-covered mound. The exit is on the opposite side of the pavilion. It was designed by KSS Architects.

The pavilion visit began with an escalator with a film either side documenting cars produced by Bentley  since the creation of the company. There was then a spiralling walkway which descends around a rotating displays of cogs illuminated by coloured lights which changed throughout. Television screens of varying sizes were located around this contraption which showed different videos of their vehicle's performance.

The Bentley pavilion was renamed in 2008, now being shared with the Bugatti brand and renamed the "Premium Clubhouse".

The displays include a Bugatti Veyron with a special chrome finish and separately an engine from the same car model.

Škoda
The Škoda pavilion consists of a number of metal sculptures.  It shows several examples of cars produced under the Škoda brand and small models of all types ever produced in Škoda's history. Like in other brand pavilions it is possible to open and enter the cars to get a feeling for them. Information about engine specifications, prices and fuel consumption are next to each car.

Lamborghini

The building is completely black and a show with an orange Lamborghini Aventador attached to the wall greets visitors.  During the show, the lights dim and dry ice floods the room before finally diminishing revealing that the car has disappeared from the wall.  During this, the car which sits on a vertical platform has been rotated 180 degrees and sits on the outside of the building.

Audi
The building is large and has a unique "sphere-guide". Each visitor gets a small plastic sphere which they first have to activate by giving their name and taking a photo with the help of wall-mounted touchscreens at the entrance. Then through the way in the pavilion, the sphere lights up with the same color as the design of the current section and visitors can push their spheres onto special hemisphere depressions on the wall thus for example launching a video about some technical information on the wall mounted displays, light up a real Audi headlight placed behind a piece of glass in the wall or creating an illusion of charging an electric A1 by floor-mounted lights. Visitors can get into the vehicles on display including an R8. At the end of the tour visitors can send their photo made at the entrance in e-mail or post it to social networking sites after dropping the sphere in the collecting pit.

SEAT

The SEAT pavilion is surrounded by water and plants and is one of the largest pavilions.  A metal archway is located at the entrance to the bridge which leads to the entrance of the building.  The roof of the entrance is glass and the wall to the right is composed solely of red wing mirrors.  There is a display of the fourth generation of the SEAT Ibiza in a glass case.  The platform it sits on rotates. The next room then comprises all current SEAT models on display.  A staircase leads up to a mezzanine level with numerous computer screens and iPads with playable racing games.  This finally leads to an exit which comprises a wooden based bridge on metal tubes. This bridge is interactive; the tubes contain speakers which play back the Seat 'castanet' SFX with each footstep across the bridge.

See also

August Horch Museum Zwickau
AutoMuseum Volkswagen
List of automobile museums
Museum mobile

References

External links

Autostadt Official Site
Volkswagen UK
Automotive Intelligence

SEAT pavilion website
Multimedia information of the SEAT pavilion
Jack Rouse Associates
The storage tower on Emporis

Museums in Lower Saxony
Volkswagen Group
Automobile museums in Germany